Mozdok is the name of several inhabited localities in Russia.

Urban localities
Mozdok, a town in Mozdoksky District of the Republic of North Ossetia-Alania

Rural localities
Mozdok, Kursk Oblast, a khutor in Kitayevsky Selsoviet of Medvensky District of Kursk Oblast
Mozdok, Tambov Oblast, a village in Berezovsky Selsoviet of Uvarovsky District of Tambov Oblast